Domnall Find Ua Dubhda (died 1126) was King of Ui Fiachrach Muaidhe.

Annalistic reference

 1126. Domhnall Finn Ua Dubhda, lord of Ui-Amhalghadha, was drowned, after he had plundered Tir-Conaill. The Annals of Tigernach have a more fulsome account, stating Domhnall the Fair Ó Dubhda, king of Uí Amalgaidh, Uí Fiachrach and Cera, a man who never gave a refusal to anyone, was drowned in driving a prey out of Tyrconnell.

External links

 http://www.ucc.ie/celt/published/T100005B/

References

 The History of Mayo, Hubert T. Knox, p. 379, 1908.

People from County Sligo
Monarchs from County Mayo
12th-century Irish monarchs